Following the signature of the first MLS players' union contract, the MLS Superdraft was limited to four rounds. As a result, the Supplemental Draft was re-incarnated to hold the additional rounds. The 2005 MLS Supplemental Draft, held on February 4, 2005, was the first re-incarnation of the MLS Supplemental Draft. The four-round event followed January's 2005 MLS SuperDraft, as teams filled out their developmental rosters.
Expansion clubs Real Salt Lake and Chivas USA received the first picks in each round. 

The most notable draft picks include fourth round draft picks Chris Wondolowski, who is one of the top career goalscorers in Major League Soccer with over 140 career MLS goals, and Jeff Larentowicz, who has played more than 380 matches in more than 10 seasons in Major League Soccer.

Round 1

Round 1 trades

Round 2

Round 2 trades

Round 3

Round 3 trades
No trades reported.

Round 4

Round 4 trades
No trades reported.

Trade Note
On 1 February 2005, MetroStars acquired a draft pick and an allocation from Real Salt Lake in exchange for defender Eddie Pope. MetroStars had the choice of swapping first-round selections in the 2005 Supplemental Draft with Real Salt Lake or taking the highest RSL second-round pick in the 2006 MLS SuperDraft. MetroStars chose the latter.

References

Major League Soccer drafts
Supplemental Draft
MLS Supplemental Draft